Mária Littomeritzky (also known as Littomeritzky-Bognár; May 12, 1927 – December 24, 2017) was a butterfly swimmer from Hungary, who competed in three consecutive Summer Olympics for her native country, starting in 1948. She was born in Szeged.

Her best individual result came in 1956, when she placed fourth in 100 metres butterfly. At the 1952 Summer Olympics she started in the heats of the 4×100 freestyle relay but was replaced for the final. Her team-mates Ilona Novák, Judit Temes, Éva Novák, Katalin Szőke won the final with a new world record and Littomeritzky also received a gold medal. At the European Championships she won a silver medal in 1954 in 100 m butterfly.

References

External links 
 
 

1927 births
2017 deaths
Olympic swimmers of Hungary
Olympic gold medalists for Hungary
Hungarian female freestyle swimmers
Hungarian female butterfly swimmers
Swimmers at the 1948 Summer Olympics
Swimmers at the 1952 Summer Olympics
Swimmers at the 1956 Summer Olympics
Sportspeople from Szeged
European Aquatics Championships medalists in swimming
Medalists at the 1952 Summer Olympics
20th-century Hungarian women
21st-century Hungarian women